Robert Pogue Harrison (born 1954 in Izmir, Turkey) is a professor of literature at Stanford University, where he is Rosina Pierotti Professor in Italian Literature in the Department of French & Italian.

Biography
Harrison received his doctorate in Romance Studies from Cornell University in 1984. In 1985, he accepted a visiting assistant professorship in the Department of French and Italian at Stanford. In 1986, he joined the faculty as an assistant professor. He was granted tenure in 1992, and was promoted to full professor in 1995. In 1997, Stanford offered him the Rosina Pierotti Chair. In 2002, he was named chair of the Department of French and Italian, which he continued to be until 2010. As of September 2014, he is once again Chair of the department.

He began his academic career as a Dante scholar, publishing The Body of Beatrice in 1988. His work quickly expanded to concern itself broadly with the Western literary and philosophical tradition, focusing on the human place in nature and what he calls "the humic foundations" of human culture.

In 1992, he published Forests: The Shadow of Civilization, a wide-ranging history of the religious, mythological, literary, and philosophical role of forests in the Western imagination.

In 2003, he published The Dominion of the Dead, in which he probes the relations the living have maintained with the dead in a number of secular domains, among them burial places, houses, testaments, images, dreams, and political institutions.

In his book Gardens: An Essay on the Human Condition (2008), Harrison focused on the role that care and cultivation play in human culture, arguing that gardens embody "the vocation of care" that defines the inner core of our humanity. Like his earlier books, Gardens offers a philosophically based vision of humanity's relation to the natural world that is founded on mortality and finitude.

His books have been translated into Chinese, French, German, Japanese, Korean, and Italian.

In addition to his academic books, he has also written many articles, chapters, and essays, including ones on figures such as Dante, Vico, and Nietzsche, as well as philosophical problems related to architecture, modernity, poetry, and nature. His own philosophical orientation reflects an enduring commitment to the phenomenological tradition.

He also contributed several essays to the New York Review of Books, to which he has been a regular contributor since 2009. He has written essays on John Muir, Theodore Roosevelt, Ralph Waldo Emerson, Giacomo Leopardi, Dante Alighieri, Harold Bloom, the King James Bible, America's natural history, and Margaret Fuller. He also recently contributed a critique of Silicon Valley culture to the New York Review of Books online blog.

He has also contributed to the Financial Times, reviewing an English-language translation of Giacomo Leopardi's Zibaldone.

In addition to his writing, he played lead guitar for the cerebral rock band Glass Wave, with whom he recorded an album in 2010.

He is also host of the radio program Entitled Opinions on Stanford's station KZSU 90.1. Entitled Opinions features hour-long conversations on topics of intellectual interest, including but not limited to history, literature, music, philosophy, and science. Most of his guests have been Stanford-affiliated thinkers, including René Girard, Hans Ulrich Gumbrecht, Marjorie Perloff, Richard Rorty, and Michel Serres, but have sometimes been outside guests, such as Vinton Cerf, Shirley Hazzard, Orhan Pamuk, and Colm Toibin. He has also interviewed a number of prominent scientists, including Andrei Linde, Paul Ehrlich, and Michael Hendrickson.

He has been a member of the American Academy of Arts and Sciences since 2007. In October 2014, he was decorated with the title of Chevalier of the Ordre des Arts et des Lettres by the French government.

Entitled Opinions

Entitled Opinions is a literary talk show hosted by Robert P. Harrison, a professor of French and Italian at Stanford University. The show was started in 2005 and it is available as a podcast. Topics range broadly on issues related to literature, ideas, and lived experience. Shows are typically a one-on-one conversation with a special guest about select topics or authors about which he or she is especially entitled to an opinion. Guests have included Werner Herzog, Marilynne Robinson, and Paul R. Ehrlich, among others. The program airs from the studios of KZSU, 90.1 FM, Stanford.

Bibliography

Books
The Body of Beatrice (Johns Hopkins University Press, 1988)
Forests: The Shadow of Civilization (University of Chicago Press, 1992)
Rome, la Pluie: A Quoi Bon Littérature? (Paris: Flammarion, 1994)
The Dominion of the Dead (University of Chicago Press, 2003)
Gardens: An Essay on the Human Condition (University of Chicago Press, 2008)
 What is Life? The Intellectual Pertinence of Erwin Schrodinger (Stanford University Press, 2011)
(with Michael R. Hendrickson, Robert B. Laughlin and Hans Ulrich Gumbrecht)
Juvenescence: A Cultural History of Our Age (University of Chicago Press, 2014)

Awards, nominations and honours
 Ordre des Arts et des Lettres
Knight (2013)

External links
Stanford French and Italian: Robert Harrison's official homepage
Entitled Opinions official website. Includes program archive.

References

Living people
Stanford University Department of French and Italian faculty
Italian emigrants to the United States
1954 births